The Battle of Las Cumbres also known as the Battle of Acultzingo was a skirmish at the Acultzingo Pass between the French invasion force under Charles de Lorencez and Mexican republican forces under Ignacio Zaragoza.  It took place on 28 April 1862.  Despite holding the high ground, Zaragoza was not willing to risk his forces by engaging the French Army in the open.  As the French troops seized the first line of Mexican entrenchments, Zaragoza withdrew his forces to their stronghold of Puebla.

See also
 Battle of Puebla
 Siege of Puebla (1847)
 Siege of Puebla (1863)

References

Conflicts in 1862
1862 in Mexico
Battles involving France
Battles involving Mexico
Battles of the Second French intervention in Mexico
April 1862 events